General Aydoğan Babaoğlu (born 1944) is a retired Turkish military officer. He was the 27th Commander of the Turkish Air Force.

References

Living people
1944 births
Turkish Air Force Academy alumni
Turkish Air Force generals
Commanders of the Turkish Air Force